The 1923 BYU Cougars football team was an American football team that represented Brigham Young University (BYU) as a member of the Rocky Mountain Conference (RMC) during the 1923 college football season. In their second season under head coach Alvin Twitchell, the Cougars compiled an overall record of 2–5 with a mark of 1–5 in conference, tied for seventh place in the RMC, and were outscored by a total of 156 to 47.

Schedule

References

BYU
BYU Cougars football seasons
BYU Cougars football